Jet-Qi Yi is a Malaysian Chinese singer songwriter. Jet Yi or Jet (as he is also commonly known) hails from the town of Miri, Sarawak in East Malaysia. He has written many songs for accomplished singers such as Jacky Cheung, Jolin Tsai, Emil Chau, Rene Liu, Fish Leong, Penny Tai and Nicholas Teo.

Discography
 Singles
 2013 – 一生一世/有料生活/有料歌手／感覺愛
 Albums
 2001 – First debut album 《戀戀不捨 Lian Lian Bu She》
 2006 – Second album 《一整片天空 Yi Zheng Pian Tian Kong》
 2008 – Third album《有你真好You Ni Zhen Hao》
 Single
 2003 – [千里之外] Qian Li Zhi Wai

Career highlights

Filmography
 Ice Kacang Puppy Love (2010)

References

External links
 Facebook

Living people
Malaysian male pop singers
People from Sarawak
Malaysian singer-songwriters
Malaysian Mandopop singers
Year of birth missing (living people)
Malaysian male singer-songwriters